Omar Adorno (born 1 August 1972) is a Puerto Rican boxer. He competed in the 1996 Summer Olympics.

References

1972 births
Living people
Boxers at the 1996 Summer Olympics
Puerto Rican male boxers
Olympic boxers of Puerto Rico
People from Morovis, Puerto Rico
Flyweight boxers